Bhumayapalle is a village in Khajipet mandal, located in Kadapa district of Indian state of Andhra Pradesh.

References 

Villages in Kadapa district